Wong Foo Wah (born 15 September 1927) is a Malaysian former sports shooter. He competed at the 1964 Summer Olympics and the 1972 Summer Olympics. He also competed at the 1966 Asian Games.

References

External links
 

1927 births
Possibly living people
Malaysian male sport shooters
Olympic shooters of Malaysia
Shooters at the 1964 Summer Olympics
Shooters at the 1972 Summer Olympics
Place of birth missing (living people)
Shooters at the 1966 Asian Games
Asian Games competitors for Malaysia